Kane Basin is an Arctic waterway lying between Greenland and Canada's northernmost island, Ellesmere Island. It links Smith Sound to Kennedy Channel and forms part of Nares Strait. It is approximately 180 kilometres in length and 130 km at its widest.

It is named after the American explorer Elisha Kane, whose expedition in search of  Franklin's lost expedition crossed it in 1854. Kane himself had named it "Peabody Bay," in honor of philanthropist George Peabody, the major funder of Kane's expedition. Currently Peabody Bay is a bay at the eastern side of the basin, off the southwestern end of the Humboldt Glacier in northern Greenland.

Further reading

 Cold Regions Research and Engineering Laboratory (U.S.). Radar Imagery of Arctic Pack Ice Kane Basin to North Pole. Hanover, N.H.: The Division, 1968.
 Hobbs, William Herbert. Discovery and Exploration Within the Area to the West of the Kane Basin. 1939.
 Kravitz, Joseph. Sediments and Sediment Processes in Kane Basin, a High Arctic Glacial Marine Basin. [Boulder, Colo.?]: University of Colorado, Institute of Arctic and Alpine Research, 1982.
 Marentette, Kris Allen. Late Quaternary Paleoceanography in Kane Basin, Canada and Greenland. Ottawa: National Library of Canada, 1989.

References

Seas of Greenland
Bays of Qikiqtaaluk Region
Canada–Greenland border
International straits
Straits of Canada